Patrizia Busignani (born 11 May 1959 in Gosselies, Belgium) was Captain Regent of San Marino from 1 April 1993 to  1 October 1993.  Her co-Regent was Salvatore Tonelli. 
   
Busignani was President of Partito Socialista Unitario from 1983 to 1990. She then became Chief of the Parliamentary Group of Socialists for Reforms, President of the Partito dei Democratici and later of the Partito dei Socialisti e dei Democratici, serving in the latter post from 2007 until 2009. In 2008 she was responsible for the PanEuropean Campaign to Combat Violence Against Women. In 2010 and 2011 she was a spokeswoman for the committee to promote a referendum on San Marino joining the European Union.

References

1959 births
20th-century women politicians
21st-century women politicians
Captains Regent of San Marino
Female heads of state
Living people
Party of Democrats politicians
Party of Socialists and Democrats politicians
Members of the Grand and General Council
Sammarinese women in politics
Belgian women in politics
Belgian people of Sammarinese descent
Unitary Socialist Party–Socialist Agreement politicians